Milan Cukovic (born 31 August 1945) is a Guamanian weightlifter. He competed in the men's heavyweight II event at the 1988 Summer Olympics.

References

1945 births
Living people
Guamanian male weightlifters
Olympic weightlifters of Guam
Weightlifters at the 1988 Summer Olympics
Place of birth missing (living people)